William Edgar Oddie  (born 7 July 1941) is an English actor, artist, birder, comedian, conservationist, musician, songwriter, television presenter and writer. He was a member of comedy trio The Goodies.

A birder since his childhood in Quinton, Birmingham, Oddie has established a reputation as a naturalist, conservationist, and television presenter on wildlife issues. Some of his books are illustrated with his own paintings and drawings. His wildlife programmes for the BBC include Springwatch and Autumnwatch, How to Watch Wildlife, Wild in Your Garden, Birding with Bill Oddie, Britain Goes Wild with Bill Oddie and Bill Oddie Goes Wild.

Early life
Oddie was born on 7 July 1941 in Rochdale, Lancashire, but moved to Birmingham at a young age; his father was assistant chief accountant at the Midlands Electricity Board. His mother was diagnosed with schizophrenia and, during most of his youth, lived in a hospital. He was educated at Lapal Primary School, Halesowen Grammar School (now The Earls High School, Halesowen) and King Edward's School, Birmingham, an all-boys direct grant school, where he captained the school's rugby union team. He then studied English literature at Pembroke College, Cambridge.

Career

Comedy
While at Cambridge University Oddie appeared in several Footlights Club productions. One of these, a revue called A Clump of Plinths, was so successful at the Edinburgh Festival Fringe that it was renamed Cambridge Circus and transferred to the West End in London, then New Zealand and Broadway in September 1964. Meanwhile, still at Cambridge, Oddie wrote scripts for and appeared briefly in TV's That Was the Week That Was.

He appeared in Bernard Braden's television series On The Braden Beat in 1964. Subsequently he was a key member of the performers in the BBC radio series I'm Sorry, I'll Read That Again, where many of his musical compositions were featured. Some were released on the album Distinctly Oddie (Polydor, 1967). He was one of the first performers to parody a rock song, arranging the traditional Yorkshire folk song "On Ilkla Moor Baht'at" in the style of Joe Cocker's hit rendition of the Beatles' "With a Little Help from My Friends" (released on John Peel's Dandelion Records in 1970 and featured in Peel's special box of most-treasured singles), and singing "Andy Pandy" in the style of a brassy soul number such as Wilson Pickett or Geno Washington might perform. In many shows he would do short impressions of Hughie Green.

On television Oddie was co-writer and performer in the comedy series Twice a Fortnight with Graeme Garden, Terry Jones, Michael Palin and Jonathan Lynn. Later he was co-writer and performer in the comedy series Broaden Your Mind with Tim Brooke-Taylor and Graeme Garden, for which he became a cast member for the second series.

Oddie, Brooke-Taylor and Garden then co-wrote and appeared in their television comedy series The Goodies (1970–1982). The Goodies also released records, including "Father Christmas Do Not Touch Me"/"The In-Betweenies", "The Funky Gibbon" (co-written by Oddie with Dave MacRae) and "Black Pudding Bertha", which were hit singles in 1974–75. They reformed, briefly, in 2005 for a successful 13-date tour of Australia.

Oddie, Brooke-Taylor and Garden voiced characters on the 1983 animated children's programme Bananaman.

In the Amnesty International show A Poke in the Eye (With a Sharp Stick), Oddie, Brooke-Taylor and Garden sang their hit song "Funky Gibbon". They also appeared on Top of the Pops with the song. Together with Garden (who is a qualified medical doctor), Oddie co-wrote many episodes of the television comedy series Doctor in the House, including most of the first season and all of the second season. He has occasionally appeared on the BBC Radio 4 panel game I'm Sorry I Haven't a Clue, on which Garden is and Brooke-Taylor was a regular panellist. In 1982 Garden and Oddie wrote, but did not perform in, a six-part science-fiction sitcom called Astronauts for Central and ITV. The show was set in an international space station in the near future.

Natural history
Oddie's first published work was an article about the birdlife of Birmingham's Bartley Reservoir in the West Midland Bird Club's 1962 Annual Report. (He is first credited in the 1956 report, in which reports of his bird observations are tagged with his initials "WEO".) He has since written a number of books about birds and birdwatching as well as articles for many specialist publications including British Birds, Birdwatching Magazine and Birdwatch.

He discussed bird-song recordings with Derek Jones in an August 1973 BBC Radio 4 programme called Sounds Natural.

In the autumn of 1976 Oddie was involved in the successful identification of Britain's first-ever record of Pallas's reed bunting on Fair Isle, Shetland.

One of Oddie's first forays into the world of television natural history was as a guest on Animal Magic in December 1977. Another early natural-history radio appearance was in October, as the guest on Radio 4's Through My Window, discussing the birds of Hampstead Heath.

On 30 July 1985 he was the subject of a 50-minute Nature Watch Special: Bill Oddie – Bird Watcher, in which he was interviewed by Julian Pettifer at places where he had spent time birding, including Bartley Reservoir, the Christopher Cadbury Wetland Reserve at Upton Warren, RSPB Titchwell Marsh and Blakeney Point.

Oddie has since hosted a number of successful nature programmes for the BBC, many produced by Stephen Moss, including:

The Great Bird Race (1983; Channel 4)
The Great Kenyan Bird Safari (BBC)
Favourite Walks: "A Bird Walk" (1985; BBC; filmed on Fair Isle)
Worldwise: "The Bird Business" (1985; Channel 4)
Oddie in Paradise (1985; BBC)
Wild Weekends (TV AM)
Flight to Eilat (Channel 4)
Bird in the Nest (two series, 1994 and 1995)
Birding with Bill Oddie (three series, 1997, 1998 and 2000)
Bill Oddie Goes Wild (three series, 2001, 2002 and 2003)
Wild in Your Garden (2003)
Britain Goes Wild (2004)
Bill Oddie in Tiger Country (2004)
Bill Oddie's How to Watch Wildlife (two series, 2005 and 2006; also on DVD)
Seven Natural Wonders (London edition) (2005)
The Truth About Killer Dinosaurs (2005; also on DVD)
Springwatch (2005–2008)
Autumnwatch (2006–2008)
Bill Oddie Back in the USA (2007)
Bill Oddie's Top Ten Birds (2007; BBC Four)
100 Years of Wildlife (2007)
Bill Oddie's Wild Side (2008)
Bill Oddie's Top 10 (2008)

The first broadcast, in 2004, of Britain Goes Wild set a record for its timeslot of 8 pm on BBC Two of 3.4 million viewers, one million more than the Channel 4 programme showing at that time. Britain Goes Wild, renamed Springwatch the following year, became a wildlife broadcasting phenomenon, attracting over 4 million viewers.

He became president of the West Midland Bird Club in 1999, having been vice-president since 1991, and is a former member of the council of the RSPB. Oddie is also a President of the League Against Cruel Sports and a vice-president of the British Trust for Conservation Volunteers. He practised as a bird ringer but allowed his licence to lapse.

In 2003, Oddie set up a half-marathon to raise money for various wildlife charities in his birth town of Rochdale. Celebrities who have participated in the event include Ray Mears, Katherine Jenkins and Hugh Fearnley-Whittingstall.

In 2011, Oddie featured as an investigator in Snares Uncovered: killers in the countryside. The film was an exposé of snaring in Scotland and was commissioned by animal protection charity OneKind. During the investigation Oddie discovered more than 70 snares and several stink pits.

Music
Oddie wrote original music at Cambridge University for the Footlights and later wrote comic songs for I'm Sorry, I'll Read That Again. He also wrote a number of comic songs for The Goodies, most of which he also performed.

In the 1960s and early 1970s Oddie released a number of singles and at least one album. One of the former, issued in 1970 on John Peel's Dandelion Records label (Catalogue No: 4786), was "On Ilkla Moor Baht 'at", performed in the style of Joe Cocker's "With a Little Help from my Friends". The B-side, "Harry Krishna", featured the Hare Krishna chant, substituting the names of contemporary famous people called Harry, including Harry Secombe, Harry Worth, Harry Lauder and Harry Corbett, as well as puns such as "Harry [Hurry] along now" and "Harrystotle [Aristotle]" and ending with "Harry-ly [I really] must go now". Both tracks appear on the compilation CD Life Too, Has Surface Noise: The Complete Dandelion Records Singles Collection 1969–1972 (2007). In 1966 he was credited as the vocalist with Spencer's Washboard Kings on "Five Feet Two" (Rayrick LCR1001a). The vocalist on the B-side of this 45rpm single, "If You Knew Susie", was Jean Hart, Oddie's future wife.

He played the drums and saxophone and appeared as Cousin Kevin in a production of The Who's rock opera Tommy at the Rainbow Theatre, Finsbury Park, London, on 9 December 1972. He has also contributed vocals to a Rick Wakeman album, Criminal Record.

He recorded a single, "Superspike", with John Cleese and a group of UK athletes, billed the "Superspike Squad", to fund the latter's attendance at the 1976 Summer Olympics in Montreal. He co-produced the record with Stephen Shane.

Oddie took part in the English National Opera production of the Gilbert and Sullivan comic opera The Mikado, in which he appeared in the role of the Lord High Executioner, taking over the role from Eric Idle. During the early 1990s Oddie was a DJ for London-based jazz radio station 102.2 Jazz FM.

In 2007, Oddie appeared on the BBC series Play It Again. In the episode he attempts to realise his dream of becoming a rock guitarist. Initially teacher Bridget Mermikides tries to teach him using traditional methods but he rebels: instead he turns to old friends Albert Lee, Dave Davies (of The Kinks) and Mark Knopfler for advice and strikes out on his own. He succeeds in the target of playing lead guitar for his daughter Rosie's band at her 21st birthday party and even manages to impress his erstwhile teacher.

In November 2010 he agreed, along with fellow members of The Goodies, to rerelease their 1970s hit "The Funky Gibbon" to raise funds for the International Primate Protection League's Save the Gibbon appeal.

Other television and voice work
Oddie appeared as the hapless window cleaner in the Eric Sykes' comedy story The Plank in 1967. He also presented the live children's Saturday morning entertainment show Saturday Banana (ITV/Southern Television) during the late 1970s. In the late 1980s he was a presenter of the BBC TV show Fax (a show about 'facts').

In 1981, he appeared as a Telethon celebrity in New Zealand, hosted by TV1. He voices Asterix in the UK dub of the 1989 animated film Asterix and the Big Fight (an animated adaptation of the books Asterix and the Big Fight and Asterix and the Soothsayer, novelized as Operation Getafix).

In 1992, he was a guest star in the US comedy television series Married... with Children for a three-part episode set in England.

In 1997–98, he appeared on the Channel 4 archaeological programme Time Team, as the team excavated a Roman villa site in Turkdean, Gloucestershire.

He was the compère of a daytime BBC gameshow History Hunt (in 2003); and has appeared in the Doctor Who audio drama Doctor Who and the Pirates. In 2004, he appeared on the first ever episode of the BBC series Who Do You Think You Are?, in which he looked into his ancestry: he was visibly moved by its revelations. In 2005, he took part in Rolf on Art – the big event at Trafalgar Square and in September that year was also a celebrity guest along with Lynda Bellingham on the ITV1 programme Who Wants to be a Millionaire. He also gave opinions on 100 greatest cartoons on Channel 4 that year, talking about Tom and Jerry and cartoon incidents such as the "Asses of Fire skit" in South Park: Bigger, Longer and Uncut.

In 2006, Oddie appeared in the BBC show Never Mind the Buzzcocks, and also appeared on the topical quiz show 8 out of 10 Cats. He was also the voice behind many B&Q adverts throughout 2006/2007. On 25 May 2007, Oddie made a cameo appearance on Ronni Ancona's new comedy sketch show, Ronni Ancona & Co.

Also in 2007, three artists each painted a portrait of Oddie, as part of the BBC programme Star Portraits with Rolf Harris. One of the artists, Mark Roscoe, later revealed a dislike of Oddie, claiming to have included hidden insults in his work.

He hosted the genealogy-based series My Famous Family, broadcast on UKTV History in 2007. In 2008, Oddie was a guest on Jamie Oliver's television special Jamie's Fowl Dinners, talking about free-range chickens.

He also appeared on Would I Lie To You? in 2011, where he revealed that he was saved from drowning by Freddy from popular children's series Rainbow and Rod, Jane and Freddy while on holiday in the Seychelles.

In February 2015, Oddie appeared in The Keith Lemon Sketch Show as the narrator of the sketch Ed Sheeran Watch.

He appeared as a contestant on a celebrity edition of Fifteen to One in August 2015 and the following month he appeared on Through the Keyhole.

He has appeared three times on the programme Pointless Celebrities, the most recent appearance being in 2016.

In 2017, he appeared in three episodes of The Real Marigold Hotel.

In 2018, he featured on the programme The Two Ronnies: In Their Own Words. In 2019, he appeared on the show The Inbetweeners: Fwends Reunited.

In 2020, he appeared in the documentary Celebrity Britain by Barge: Then & Now.

2013 Australian tour
Oddie undertook an Australian tour during June 2013 in all of the mainland states capital cities – Brisbane, Sydney, Melbourne, Adelaide and Perth – in a series of one-off shows, An Oldie but a Goodie. A video message from Tim Brooke-Taylor and Graeme Garden was shown during the performances. Oddie made personal appearances on both The Project and Adam Hills Tonight TV shows during the tour; he also filmed a guest-programming spot for the ABC-TV's all-night music video show Rage.

Personal life

Family
In 1966 Oddie married Jeanne Hart, and from this marriage he has two daughters, one of whom is the actress Kate Hardie. The couple later divorced.

In 1983 Oddie married Laura Beaumont-Giles. The couple have worked on a variety of projects for children, including film scripts, drama and comedy series, puppet shows and books. They have a daughter, Rosie, born in October 1985, and live in Hampstead, North London. Rosie Oddie is a musician, also using the name Rosie Bones.

Mental health
Oddie has experienced depression for most of his life before being diagnosed with clinical depression in 2001. In March 2009 he was reportedly admitted to Capio Nightingale psychiatric hospital in Marylebone for treatment. His then agent, David Foster, said: "Bill gets these bouts every two or three years where he gets down for about two weeks and recovers. He sometimes goes into hospital or takes a break or has a change of scenery to recharge his batteries." In January 2010 Oddie spoke to the media, revealing that he had in fact had two separate stays in different hospitals, only being discharged "in time for Christmas". He said that he was dealing with depression and bipolar disorder, describing the period as "probably the worst 12 months of my life". Oddie stated that he was planning to meet BBC executives to discuss his return to television work.

His illness meant that Oddie did not appear in the 2009 and 2010 series of Springwatch, although he made a guest appearance in the penultimate episode of the latter. He subsequently said he was dismissed from Springwatch and that this had caused the depressive illness.

Oddie presented the BBC Radio 4 Appeal programme on 10 August 2014 on behalf of the charity Bipolar UK. He revealed that as a consequence of his bipolar disorder he had attempted suicide during one of his depressive episodes. On the UK TV programme Who Do You Think You Are? he attributed his depression and bipolar disorder as an adult to his minimal and painful relationship with his mother.

Political views
Oddie supports the Green Party. In October 2014, on the BBC's Sunday Morning Live, he stated that he wanted a limit on the number of children that British families can have, saying that he was "very often ashamed" to be British, calling them "a terrible race".

Honours
In 2002, Oddie became the third person to decline to appear on This Is Your Life but changed his mind a few hours later. On 16 October 2003 Oddie was made an OBE for his service to Wildlife Conservation in a ceremony at Buckingham Palace. He wore a camouflage shirt and crumpled jacket to receive his medal. In June 2004 Oddie and Johnny Morris were jointly profiled in the first of a three-part BBC Two series The Way We Went Wild, about television wildlife presenters. In May 2005 he received the British Naturalists' Association's Peter Scott Memorial Award, from BNA president David Bellamy, "in recognition of his great contribution to our understanding of natural history and conservation." He is a recipient of the RSPB Medal.

On 30 June 2009 he was proposed for inclusion in the Birmingham Walk of Stars, with the public invited to vote.

Bibliography
(incomplete list)
Bill Oddie Unplucked: Columns, Blogs and Musings  (Bloomsbury, 2015)
Bill Oddie's Introduction to Birdwatching (Subbuteo Books, 2002)
Bill Oddie's Colouring Guide to Birds (Piccolo, 1991)
Bill Oddie's Little Black Bird Book
Bill Oddie's Little Black Bird Book (paperback with additional material)
Bill Oddie's Gone Birding
The Big Bird Race (with David Tomlinson; Collins, 1983)
Follow That Bird!
Gripping Yarns (Christopher Helm, 2000)
Bird in the Nest
Bill Oddie's How to Watch Wildlife
One Flew into the Cuckoos Egg (Autobiography)
Bill Oddie also co-wrote the Springwatch & Autumnwatch book with Kate Humble and Simon King.

Co-written with the other members of The Goodies:
The Goodies File
The Goodies Book of Criminal Records
The Goodies Disaster Movie

Co-written with Laura Beaumont:
The Toilet Book (or 11 & ½ minutes a day and how not to waste them) (Methuen, 1984)

Contributions
Confessions of a Scilly Birdman, David Hunt; Croom Helm, 1985.  (foreword and postscript)
Birds in the Yorkshire Museum, Michael Denton; North Yorkshire County Council, 1995.  (foreword)
Bird Brain of Britain, Charles Gallimore & Tim Appleton; Christopher Helm, 2004.  (foreword)
Blokes and Birds, Stephen Moss; New Holland Publishers.  (foreword)
The New Birds of the West Midlands, Graham and Janet Harrison (West Midland Bird Club, 2005)  (foreword)

Discography

Albums

Singles

In popular culture
In the fictional world of comedy character Alan Partridge, Oddie is an unseen presence in Alan's life, buying him dressing gowns for Christmas and being part of a radicalised RSPB. He has also been referenced, often humorously, by the hosts of Top Gear.

References

Sources

External links

Bill Oddie's family history at the BBC website for the programme Who Do You Think You Are?
Bill Oddie Goes Wild – on BBC's Science and Nature website
In-depth interview, The Telegraph, 28 April 2005
Gigrin Farm chapter from Gripping Yarns
Oddie on UKTV

1941 births
Living people
Alumni of Pembroke College, Cambridge
British ornithologists
English television presenters
English male comedians
English comedy writers
English illustrators
English nature writers
English naturalists
English male radio actors
English radio writers
English male television actors
English television writers
English television composers
English male composers
English tenors
English male voice actors
British male television writers
Officers of the Order of the British Empire
People educated at King Edward's School, Birmingham
Writers from Birmingham, West Midlands
People from Rochdale
People with bipolar disorder
Royal Society for the Protection of Birds people
Birdwatchers
British bird artists
Comedians from Birmingham, West Midlands
Writers who illustrated their own writing
English autobiographers
20th-century English comedians
21st-century English comedians
Audiobook narrators